The Tucana-Horologium association (Tuc-Hor), or Tucana Horologium moving group, is a stellar association with an age of 45 ± 4 Myr and it is one of the largest stellar associations within . The association has a similar size to the Beta Pictoris moving group (BPMG) and contains, like BPMG, more than 12 stars with spectral type B, A and F. The association is named after two southern constellations, the constellation Tucana and the constellation Horologium.

The group was at first not recognized as an individual group, but stars within the group were first assigned to the Great Austral Young Association (GAYA). Only later did it become clear that this complex is divided into three groups: the Tucana-Horologium association, the Carina association and the Columba association.

Members 
The members of this young group are potential targets for directly imaged circumstellar disks and exoplanets. The stars are located close to Earth and the planets are young, so they give off more infrared light, which is suited for directly imaging techniques. AB Pictoris was considered a member of Tuc-Hor, but it is more likely a member of the Carina association.

The brightest-identified member of the association is the massive star Alpha Pavonis, which is leaving the main sequence. The association also contains stars of the Beta Tucanae group. Another notable member is DS Tucanae, which is a binary star, with the primary having one exoplanet transiting in front of the star.

Debris disks have been detected around some members. Examples are HD 1466, HD 10472, DK Ceti, CPD-74 192, HD 21997, HD 32195, HD 37484, HD 38206, V1358 Orionis and HD 85672. The star HD 202917 has a debris disk that was directly imaged with the Hubble Space Telescope. The brown dwarf 2MASS J02265658-5327032 is likely a member of the Tuc-Hor association and has a circumstellar disk, which is unusual for its age. Some researchers call these relatively old disks Peter Pan disks.

Examples of directly imaged planets in the association are 2MASS 0219-3925 b and 2MASS 0103(AB) b.

The list below shows some members of the group. The list is focused on B-type, A-type and F-type stars and other stars/brown dwarfs are included if they are notable. The list is sorted after the brightness.

See also 

 List of nearby stellar associations and moving groups
 AB Doradus moving group
 Coma Star Cluster

References 

Moving groups
Stellar associations